Patrik Stöcker (born 23 July 1992) is a German lightweight rower. He won a gold medal at the 2016 World Rowing Championships in Rotterdam with the lightweight men's quadruple scull.

References

1992 births
Living people
German male rowers
World Rowing Championships medalists for Germany